Rommel is a 2012 German television film first shown on Das Erste. It is a dramatisation of the last days of German general Erwin Rommel.

Plot 
This made-for-TV-movie starts on the last day (October 14, 1944) of Rommel's life with a talk between him and generals Wilhelm Burgdorf and Ernst Maisel. In this talk the generals present incriminating material. They say Rommel has the choice between suicide and a trial before the  Volksgerichtshof. After this scene the last months of his life from March 1944 are presented chronologically. At this time Rommel is responsible for the Atlantikwall built to prevent an invasion by the allied forces.

Cast 
 Ulrich Tukur as Generalfeldmarschall Erwin Rommel
 Tim Bergmann as Oberstleutnant Caesar von Hofacker
 Rolf Kanies as Oberst Eberhard Finckh
 Patrick Mölleken as Manfred Rommel
 Hanns Zischler as Generalfeldmarschall Gerd von Rundstedt
 Klaus J. Behrendt as Generaloberst Heinz Guderian
 Benjamin Sadler as Generalleutnant Dr. Hans Speidel
 Aglaia Szyszkowitz as Lucie-Maria Rommel
 Robert Schupp as Hauptmann Aldinger
 Peter Wolf as Obergruppenführer Ernst Kaltenbrunner
 Hubertus Hartmann as General der Infanterie Carl-Heinrich von Stülpnagel
 Vicky Krieps as Comtesse La Rochefoucauld
 Michael Kranz as Feldwebel Karl Daniel (Rommel's driver)
 Johannes Silberschneider as Adolf Hitler
 Oliver Nägele as General der Infanterie Günther Blumentritt
 Hary Prinz as General der Panzertruppe Von Schweppenburg
 Hans Kremer as General der Artillerie Erich Marcks
 Peter Kremer as General der Infanterie Wilhelm Burgdorf
 Thomas Thieme as Generalfeldmarschall Günther von Kluge
 Maximilian von Pufendorf as Generalmajor Von Tempelhoff
 Joe Bausch as Generalfeldmarschall Wilhelm Keitel (uncredited)
 Detlef Bothe as Gruppenführer Carl Oberg (uncredited)

References

External links 

2012 television films
2012 films
2010s war films
2010s biographical films
German television films
2010s German-language films
German-language television shows
German war films
French war films
Austrian war films
German biographical films
Biographical films about military leaders
Western Front of World War II films
Operation Overlord films
Films about the 20 July plot
Cultural depictions of Erwin Rommel
German World War II films
French World War II films
Austrian World War II films
2010s French films
2010s German films
Das Erste original programming